Nobet Ida (born 20 May 1993) is a Sri Lankan cricketer who played for the Sri Lanka women's cricket team. In October 2013, she was one three uncapped players to be selected for Sri Lanka's tour to South Africa. She made her Women's One Day International cricket (WODI) debut for Sri Lanka against South Africa Women on 24 October 2013.

References

External links
 

1993 births
Living people
Sri Lankan women cricketers
Sri Lanka women One Day International cricketers
Place of birth missing (living people)